Foundations of the Science of Knowledge is a 1794/1795 book by the German philosopher Johann Gottlieb Fichte. Based on lectures Fichte had delivered as a professor of philosophy at the University of Jena, it was later reworked in various versions. The standard Wissenschaftslehre was published in 1804, but other versions appeared posthumously.

Ideas 
Science of Knowledge has first established Fichte's independent philosophy. The contents of the book, which were divided into eleven sections, were crucial in the way the thinker has grounded philosophy as - for the first time - a part of epistemology. In the book, Fichte has also claimed that an "experiencer" must be tacitly aware that he is experiencing in order to lead to "noticing". This articulated his view that an individual's experience is essentially the experiencing of the act of experiencing so that his so-called "Absolutely Unconditioned Principle" of all experience is that "the I posits itself".

Reception
In 1798, the German romantic Friedrich Schlegel identified the Wissenschaftslehre, together with the French revolution and Johann Wolfgang von Goethe's Wilhelm Meister, as "the most important trend-setting events (Tendenzen) of the age."

Michael Inwood believes that the work is close in spirit to the early works of Edmund Husserl, including the Ideas (1913) and the Cartesian Meditations (1931).

The Wissenschaftslehre has been described by Roger Scruton as being both "immensely difficult" and "rough-hewn and uncouth".

See also
 Foundationalism

References

Notes

Bibliography

 
 
 

1794 non-fiction books
Books by Johann Gottlieb Fichte
Epistemology literature
Philosophy of science literature